Kaliana is a village in the Nicosia District of Cyprus, located 3 km south of Temvria.

References

Communities in Nicosia District